DGL could refer to:

 Deglycyrrhizinated licorice
 Diacylglycerol lipase
 Dingle Road railway station, Wales; National Rail station code DGL.
 Douglas Municipal Airport (Arizona), United States; IATA airport code DGL.
 Down Gilead Lane, a Christian radio show by CBH Ministries.
 the postal code of Dingli, Malta
 Diocese of the Great Lakes
 Vehicle registration plate area code for Głogów County, Poland
 DGL Group, Australia–New Zealand chemicals company listed on the Australian Securities Exchange